Waste Concern is a Bangladeshi Social Business Enterprise (S.B.E) for waste recycling

About
Waste Concern was found in 1996 with the motto "Waste is a Resource".  It was established by A.H.Md. Maqsood Sinha, a professional architect-urban planner, and Iftekhar Enayetullah, a civil engineer-urban planner. The enterprise currently has 24 professional staff members and 8 consultants. The company started out as a decentralized community model for waste recycling to transform solid waste into organic compost using low cost, low technology, and less labor-intensive methods.  It later grew into a Waste Concern Group, comprising both "For Profit" and "Not-for Profit" arms.  The work of the group in Bangladesh has led to joint-partnerships with the United Nations Economic and Social Commission for Asia and Pacific (UNESCAP) with the goal of replicating the model in ten Asian cities. Because the composting plants are simple, low cost, and not labor-intensive, they are suitable to the socio-economic and climate condition of Bangladesh.

Mechanism
In Dhaka, the team from Waste Concern collects trash for recycling. This waste is taken to several processing centers and turns 100 tons of garbage into compost daily.[1] This community-based composting (CBC), in which residents put their food scraps into large composting barrels that sit on concrete bases and can hold up to 400 pounds, has been copied in over 26 cities in Bangladesh.[2] This system of composting reduces greenhouse gases produced by rotting garbage, which prompted World Wide Recycling to invest $8 million into Waste Concern's new facilities.[3]

Strategy

Use Science Data
Door-to-door surveys and data analysis were used to come up with a business model to convert organic waste to compost. The data informed investors of the feasibility and sustainability of their Waste Concern.

Establish community-run operations
The firm employs impoverished citizens [citation needed] to collect organic waste and transport it to the processing center. This involves the creation of several small-scale enterprises in neighborhoods, which acts as part of a decentralized waste management model. Their operations include house-to-house waste collection, composting of the collected waste by sending it to compost plants and marketing of the compost and recyclable materials to interested buyers and businesses. [1] According to the founders, this form of community-run operation establishes Waste Concern as an overarching social organization that not only aims to empower its employees but also, increase their quality of life. [2]

Explore new market opportunities
The organisation uses its technology to help other companies in other industries solve their waste management problems [citation needed]. Initially, Waste Concern's business model was to market and sell compost to rural farmers. However, with potential market opportunities in the commercial sector and incentives to leverage on economic efficiency, the concern started to increase production, supplying compost to fertilizer companies. [1] In addition, Waste Concern has been asked by a number of poultry farms to develop a poultry manure composting technique. [2] By exporting its services and technologies, Waste Concern is able to leverage on its capability and explore new opportunities and has since attracted the attention of private fertilizer companies.

Results
Since its inception, Waste Concern addresses the twin problems of waste accretion and land infertility by reducing waste and converting it into usable compost as fertilizers for horticulture and agriculture [citation needed]. From 2001 to 2006, Waste Concern has been able to reduce 17,000 tons of Green House gas emissions [citation needed], generate employment for 986 impoverished citizens [citation needed], and save a landfill area of 33.12 acres with a depth of 1 meter [citation needed]. During the same period, they processed 124,400 tons of organic waste and produced 31,100 tons of compost [citation needed]. Their composing activities benefited 60,000 people in Dhaka and an additional 434,290 people from its replication in other parts of the country. [1]

Currently, Waste Concern produces 7,500 tons of compost in Dhaka and 8,087 tons in other parts of Bangladesh each year. [2] Furthermore, the technology used for composting can treat 30,000–35,000 tons of waste per year and reduces carbon emission by 20,000 tons of carbon dioxide per year.[3] The project creates better paid and more hygiene jobs and hence, reduces the unemployment rate in Bangladesh. The project also provides organic alternative to fertilizers in a country where there are so few non-chemical ones.[4] In addition, Waste Concern helps to save the environment through the promotion of recycling activities in the country. Furthermore, there is increased revenue generation through carbon co-financing and Clean Development Mechanism (CDM), which launched under the Kyoto Protocol, will create the world's first carbon trading based composting project. [5]

Problems

Corrosion

During the composting process, both sides of the composting barrel show signs of corrosion after a certain operating time due to the acids produced during the process of decomposition. Although the barrel is painted with anticorrosive paint, it could not withstand the intensity of the acids and hence, undergoes corrosive over time.

Working conditions
There have been concerns over the working conditions of the workers. The high chance of getting infections and diseases due to the high concentration of pathogenic micro-organisms coupled with the high risk of injuries and infections caused by objects such as fragments of broken glass, syringes, metallic and other rough objects contribute to undesirable working conditions. Although safety equipment's have been given to the workers [citation needed], they do not wear them all the time [citation needed] and hence, this contributes to higher risk of getting health ailments while working. Furthermore, there have been concerns over the water supply, which is in close distance to the composting piles. This leads to contamination and problems of workers using the contaminated water for personal use. [1]

References 

Recycling organizations
Environmental organisations based in Bangladesh